D.C. United  is the holding company that controls operating rights to D.C. United, a professional soccer club that is part of Major League Soccer (MLS). The company, founded in 2007, was initially led by William H.C. Chang (chairman of Westlake International Group),  Brian Davis and Christian Laettner (co-managers of Blue Devil Ventures), and Kevin Payne (president of D.C. United) who maintained his position with the new investors. At the time of formation, D.C. United Holdings was also interested in adding Discovery Communications founder John Hendricks, also the founder of the now-defunct Women's United Soccer Association, to the "majority-minority" group. Brian Davis and former owner Victor MacFarlane were the first African-American owners in MLS; William H.C. Chang is the first Asian-American.  D.C. United Holdings bought D.C. United from Anschutz Entertainment Group for $33 million, a record fee for operational rights to an MLS club. The team now plays at a soccer specific stadium, Audi Field.

On May 21, 2009, previous stakeholder Victor MacFarlane announced the sale of his share of D.C. United Holdings to majority owner William Chang, giving him a 98% stake in the organization. On October 21, 2009, Chang bought out Davis and Laettner, who held the remaining 2%, to fully control 100% of the team.

In 2012, Erick Thohir and Jason Levien purchased the club and its holding company, with Chang remaining as a minority investor. Their efforts are primarily focused on getting United a new stadium and enhancing the four-time MLS champions' global profile. A minority stake in the club was purchased by a rapper Mario Mims, better known as Yo Gotti, in September 2021.

References

Privately held companies based in Washington, D.C.